Premios Texas (Texas Latin Awards) is a Latin music awards celebration.

Produced by KAKW Univision 62 Austin, "Premios Texas" bestows awards annually to the winners from the five most popular Latin music genres including - Pop, Tropical, Regional Mexican, Rock and Urban - as well as the Lifetime Achievement Award, given to a performer who, during their lifetime, has made creative contributions of outstanding artistic significance to Latin music.

History
Premios Texas is an annual people's choice award ceremony honoring the best in the Latin music industry. Based in Austin, Texas, the show debuted in 2005 at The One World Theatre to a local audience of 200 spectators.

Hosts and celebrity attendees include:

2013
Hosted by: Carlos Calderon & Alejandra Espinoza

Attendees/Winners Included:
Gloria Trevi
Moderatto
Fey
La Maquinaria Norteña
Noel Torres
Diana Reyes
Jking y Maximan 
La Leyenda
Andres Cuervo
Banda La Trakalosa de Monterrey
Chingo Bling
8 segundos
Siggno
EL Pelon del Mikrophone
AJ castillo
Grupo Treo

2012
Hosted by: Cynthia Urias & Jose Ron

Attendees/Winners Included:
Diego Verdaguer
Dulce Maria
Elvis Crespo
Diana Reyes
La Original Banda Limon
El Trono de Mexico
Lalo Mora &Lalo Mora Jr.
La Leyenda
La Maquinaria Norteña
Frankie J
Leonel Garcia
Chingo Bling
Fonseca
Siggno
8 Segundos
Las Fenix
Fedro

2011
Hosted by: Marissa Del Portillo & Diego Shoenig

Attendees/Winners Included:
Pedro Fernandez
Shaila Durcal
Duelo
La Original Banda Limon
Las Fenix
Joey Montana
Diana Reyes
Michael Salgado
Bobby Pulido
Sunny Sauceda
El Guero
Dyland y Lenny
Lidia Cavazos
Siggno
Liz Clapes
FM5
Don Tetto
Herencia Tropical

2010
Hosted by: Jackie Guerrido & Raul Brindis

Attendees/Winners included:
Aleks Syntek
Chino y Nacho
Ozomatli
Edward James Olmos
Bobby Pulido
Christina Eustace
Diana Reyes
AJ Castillo
Ana Isabelle
Angel y Khriz
El Guero y su banda Centenario
Pee Wee
Ruben Ramos
Michael Salgado

Past winners of prestigious people’s choice awards include:
Dulce Maria
Rogelio Martinez
Horoscopos de Durango
Pablo Montero
Bobby Pulido
Kumbia All Starz
Selena y Los Dinos
La Mafia
El Guero y Su Banda Centenario
Emilio Navaira
Ruben Ramos
Kany Garcia
DJ Flex
Intocable
Graciela Beltrán

Lifetime achievement award
The following list includes past recipients of the grand award, Lifetime Achievement.

2005:Flaco Jimenez

2006:Ruben Ramos

2007:Little Joe

2008:A.B. Quintanilla III

2009:Olga Tañon

2010:Aleks Syntek

2011:Pedro Fernandez

2012:Diego Verdaguer

2013:Gloria Trevi

External links
Premios Texas Website
Premios Texas Facebook Page
Premios Texas Twitter Page

American music awards
Music of Texas
Latin American music awards
Awards honoring Hispanic and Latino Americans